Dahitane is a village in Barshi Taluka of Solapur district in Maharashtra, India. The village is located between Town Vairag and Tehsil Mohol. Dahitane is a village panchayat located in the Solapur district of Maharashtra state, India. 
The latitude 18.0079127 and longitude 75.7683995 are the geocoordinate of the Dahitane. Mumbai is the state capital for Dahitane village. It is located around 328.5 kilometer away from Dahitane. 
The other nearest state capital from Dahitane is Hyderabad and its distance is 295.1 km. The other surrounding state capitals are Hyderabad 295.1 km, Daman 408.8 km, Bangalore 591.6 km.

Geography
Dahitane is located around 39.7 kilometer away from its district headquarter Solapur. The other nearest district headquarters is Osmanabad situated at 33.0 km distance from Dahitane. Surrounding districts from Dahitane are as follows.
 Osmanabad district 33.0 km
 Latur district 96.7 km
 Beed district 101.2 km
 Sangali district 199 km

Yatra Festival
 Every Year as per Marathi Calendar Third Thursday in Margashish months Big Festival God of Dahitane Shri. Changdev Patil Maharaj.

River
 Nagziri River in Dahitane

Language
The native language of Dahitane is Marathi and most of the village people speak Marathi. Dahitane people use Marathi language for communication.

Transport

Road
Dahitane's Located on Vairag- Mohol Road, nearest Transport Big Bus Station is Vairag Bus Station situated at 7.0 km distance. The following table shows other Bus stations and its distance from Dahitane.
Vairag Bus Station 7.0 km
Barshi Bus Station 29.0 km
Mohol Bus Station 29.0 km
Solapur Bus Station 47.0 km
Tuljapur Bus Station 42.0 km
Dharashiv (Osmanabad) Bus Station 57.0 km
Every 1 hours MSRTC Bus go Vairag via Dahitane To Mohol & Mohol via Dahitane To Vairag. 
Vairag MSRTC Bus Stop Every day 
Start Bus 6.10 Am 
Last Bus 7.15 Pm 
Mohol (NH09) MSRTC Bus Stop Every day 
Start Bus 6.10 Am 
Last Bus 7.15 Pm

Rail
The nearest railway station to Dahitane is Malikpeth which is located in and around 21.6 kilometer distance. The following table shows other railway stations and its distance from Dahitane.
 Barshi railway station	32.5 km
 Madha railway station	36.6 km
 Mohol railway station	34.7 km

Air
Dahitane's nearest airport is Boramani International Airport situated at 59.4 km distance. Few more airports around Dahitane are as follows.
 Osmanabad Airport 77.5 km

Education
Dahitane nearest schools has been listed as follows.
 Z P School Dahitane 0 km
 Changdev Patil Madyamik Vidyalay 0 km
 in Vairag many colleges & Schools 7 km

Social Pages Link
https://www.facebook.com/Dahitane/
https://www.youtube.com/channel/UCy5XWenjEoJLaANOjQw0MEg
https://twitter.com/DahitaneBS

Villages in Solan district